Américo Ruffino (Buenos Aires, 27 July 1905 – Buenos Aires, 4 July 1988) was an Argentine football player. Ruffino spent the vast majority of his career with the Palermo team.

A winger, he scored the first Serie A goal in the history of the Sicilian team (1932–33 season, Lazio-Palermo 1-1).

External links
Profile at Enciclopedia Del Calcio

1905 births
1988 deaths
Footballers from Buenos Aires
Argentine footballers
Association football midfielders
Torino F.C. players
Palermo F.C. players
Trapani Calcio players
Potenza S.C. players
Serie A players
Serie B players
Argentine expatriate footballers
Expatriate footballers in Italy